BRP Bagong Silang (PB-104) is the fourth ship of the Kagitingan class coastal patrol interdiction crafts of the Philippine Navy. It was designed in Germany, and built in the Philippines, and was commissioned with the Philippine Navy in June 1983 as BRP Bagong Silang (PG-104).

It was reclassified to BRP Bagong Silang (PB-104) in April 2016 under the new classification standards of the Philippine Navy classifying it as a patrol boat.

Design
The boat and all the ships in its class was considered to be unsuccessful, and was originally designed to have a maximum speed of 28 knots, but the design failed to achieve the said speed as it was underpowered.

The boat was installed with the Selenia Orion RTN-10X fire control radar and Selenia Elsag NA-10 Mod.0 gunfire control system, but it appears that they have been removed.

It was also originally armed with the Emerlec EX-31 30mm twin gun mount, but was replaced by a Bofors Mark 3 40mm/60 caliber gun several years later.

References

Ships of the Philippine Navy